Sheykh Nowruz Shahrak-e Fath (also Romanized as Sheykh Nowrūz Shahrak-e Fatḩ; also known as Fatḩ) is a village in Dasht-e Abbas Rural District, Musian District, Dehloran County, Ilam Province, Iran. At the 2006 census, its population was 321, in 48 families.

References 

Populated places in Dehloran County